Shiga Prefectural Ishiyama High School is a senior high school located in Ōtsu, Shiga, Japan. It is called Ishi-Kou as a term of endearment by the locals.

There are two courses at the school: Comprehensive Course ("普通科") and Musical Course ("音楽科"). This is the only high school in Shiga, which has the Musical Course.

About 1000 students are enrolled, and more than the half of them are female.

The school motto is "Independence and Autonomy" ("自主・自律"). Students are expected to discipline themselves. Therefore, there has not been any school rule about students' clothes and hairstyles even though most of Japanese schools set such rules.

The school song was composed by Yasuhiko Murachi.

It is famous for sending many students into university. The percentage of the students going on to university was 58.4% in 2004; and it was the fourth highest in Shiga.

History 
 1 April 1963 – Shiga Prefectural Ishiyama High School was founded in Nishino-chō, Ōtsu, where Shiga University had been.
 1 April 1964 – It moved to Kokubu-chō, Ōtsu.
 1 April 1968 – Musical Course was set up.

Kokubu-Sai 
The school festival, Kokubu-Sai ("石舞祭") is annually held. It is all managed by students. The name of the festival is derived from the school's address (Kokubu, Ōtsu); its kanji, nevertheless, is different.

At the festival, there are two parts: cultural festival and sports festival.  Every year, the 10th-year students participate in exhibitions, the 11th-year students in dramas, and the 12th in booths in the cultural festival.

Themes 
 1994 – "Kansai Kokusai Kūkō"
 1995 – (Unknown)
 1996 – (Unknown)
 1997 – (Unknown)
 1998 – (Unknown)
 1999 – (Unknown)
 2000 – "The first and the last: On the honor of the biggest festival in Shiga"
 2001 – "Infinite 2∞1"
 2002 – "Bright trajectory: To go down in Kokubu's history"
 2003 – "Calling smiles / ECO: Our revolution, resonate right now!"
 2004 – "Buyūden: Legend with friends in Kokubu"
 2005 – "Bushidō: Compeers of Kokubu, pioneer!!"
 2006 – "Koku-Bridge"
 2007 – "Aikoku-shin: Nine loves sworn for Kokubu"
 2008 – "Incitement and stimulation"
 2009 – (Unknown)
 2010 – "KKB48, get crazy, the spirits of Kokubu"

International Relations 
Foreign students visit the school festival every year.

Facilities 
 Main building
 Musical Course building
 Musical hall "Kosei"
 Small hall
 Library building
 Gymnasium
 Training hall
 Pool
 Club house
 Alumni House "Ishi-Kou Kaikan"
 House "Kokubu Kaikan"

Clubs

Sports 
 Kendo
 Soccer
 Mountain
 Judo
 Swimming
 Soft tennis
 Softball
 Artistic gymnastics
 Table tennis
 Basketball – Men's club won third prize in National Interscholastic Athletic Competition in 1981.
 Badminton
 Volleyball
 Fencing – It is a pioneering club in Shiga, and often participates in National Interscholastic Athletic Competitions.
 Baseball – It participated in Japanese High School Baseball Invitational Tournament in 1994.
 Rugby
 Track and field

Cultural 
 Film
 English language
 Drama
 Science
 Choir
 Tea ceremony and Kado
 Social issues
 Photography
 Shodo
 Newspaper
 Wind-instrument music
 Art
 Literature
 Broadcasting

Semi-official 
 Light music

Access 
 20 min. from Ishiyama Station (JR Biwako Line)
 10 min. from Ishiyamadera Station (Keihan Ishiyama Sakamoto Line)

Graduates 
 Setsuko Karasuma – Actress
 Tetsu – Comedian
 Satsuki Yukino – Voice actress
 Mitsuhiko Imamori – Photographer

References

External links 
 Official Web Site

High schools in Shiga Prefecture
1963 establishments in Japan
Educational institutions established in 1963